New Vintage is the tenth studio album by Canadian jazz trumpeter Maynard Ferguson released in 1977 on Columbia Records.
The title is likely an allusion to new recordings of two 'vintage' titles included in the track list. "Maria" was first recorded on Maynard '62 (it is presented here in a new arrangement), and "Airegin" was first recorded in 1964 for the album Color Him Wild (this new recording features the original Mike Abene arrangement). The front cover plays on this theme, presenting a trumpet in an ice bucket in place of a bottle of champagne, while on the back cover, the cork is seen popping out of the trumpet's bell.

Background and production 
After unexpectedly "catching lightning in a bottle" with Conquistador, Columbia and Ferguson were eager to repeat the success. Taking the same basic ingredients of a big theme song ("Star Wars"), a couple of originals, some guest guitar work (this time provided by Steve Khan), a reworking of a classical theme (in the same vein as Primal Scream's "Pagliacci"), a couple of Bobby Militello flute solos, and looking deep into Maynard's book to revive "Airegin", for a high-energy finale, they hoped to re-create that same magic while Conquistador was still on the charts. This was also a return to using the touring band as the core of the album's sound, with only a slightly augmented brass section. The strings and background vocalists were still used to maintain the level of production and polish from the previous 2 albums.

Critical reception 

Following the same strategy as the previous album, the album's opening track ("Main Title (From the 20th Century-Fox Film Star Wars)") was released as a single, but didn't have nearly the success as Conquistador'''s "Gonna Fly Now". As with other albums of this period, reviewers were not kind regarding this release, and didn't hesitate to make their contempt known. AllMusic's Matt Collar summed up how many reviewers felt, calling it "Utterly gimmicky and bereft of any actual jazz..."

 Reissues 
In 2004, New Vintage'' was reissued by Wounded Bird Records.

Track listing 
All compositions arranged and conducted by Jay Chattaway except "Airegin" arranged by Mike Abene.

Personnel 
Credits adapted from the album cover.

 Maynard Ferguson – Trumpet, Flugelhorn (Trumpet solos on all tracks except "Oasis" on Flugelhorn)

The M.F. Band 
 Mark Colby – Tenor, Soprano Saxophone (Soprano solo on "Oasis", Tenor solo on "El Vuelo (The Flight)")
 Peter Erskine – Drums (Solo on "Airegin")
 Biff Hannon – Electric and Acoustic Piano, Micromoog, and Polymoog Synthesizer (Piano solo on "Airegin")
 Roger Homefield – Trombone
 (uncredited) Gordon Johnson – Bass
 Nick Lane – Trombone
 Stan Mark – Trumpet, Flugelhorn
 Mike Migliore – Alto, Soprano Saxophone (Alto solos on "Main Title (From the 20th Century-Fox Film "Star Wars")" and "Airegin")
 Bob Militello – Baritone Saxophone, Flute (Flute solo on "Maria" and "Scheherazade")
 Joe Mosello – Trumpet, Flugelhorn, Congas, Percussion
 Dennis Noday – Trumpet, Flugelhorn
 Randy Purcell – Trombone
 Ron Tooley – Trumpet, Flugelhorn
 Eric Traub – Tenor, Soprano Saxophone
 Tony Romano – Sound and The Tony Rome Show

Additional musicians 
 Ralph MacDonald – Percussion
 Steve Khan – Electric and Acoustic 6 and 12-String Guitars, Classical Guitar (Solos on "Main Title (From the 20th Century-Fox Film "Star Wars")" and "Scheherazade")
 David Taylor – Trombone
 Donald Corrado – French Horn
 Jim Buffington – French Horn
 Brooks Tillotson – French Horn
 Earl Chapin – French Horn

Strings 

 Gloria Agostini (Harp)
 Jonathan Aloramowitz
 Lamar Alsop
 Seymour Barab
 Arnold Black
 Alfred Brown
 Frederick Buldrini
 Harold Coletta
 Harry Cykman
 Richard Davis
 Max Ellen
 Lewis Ely
 Barry Finclair
 Louis Gabowitz
 Harry Glickman
 Theodore Israel
 Harold Kohon
 Charles Libove
 Charles McCracken
 Marvin Morgenstern
 David Nadien
 Tony Posk
 Matthew Raimondi
 Alan Shulman
 Herbert Sorkin
 Richard Sortomme
 Emanuel Vardi

Vocalists 

 Richard Berg
 Ellen Benfield
 Katie Irving
 Tina Kaplan
 Tony Wells

Production 
 Produced by Jay Chattaway
 Associate producer: Maynard Ferguson
 Recorded and mixed by Bob Clearmountain at Mediasound Studios, New York City, except "Airegin", which was recorded and mixed by Don Puluse at CBS Recording Studios, N.Y.C.
 Master Engineering: Vlado Mellor
 Cover concept, sleeve design: Reed Rankin
 Album design: Robert Biro
 Photography: Ulf Skogsbergh
 Lettering: Frank Conley
 Additional photography: Gary Adcock, Bobby Bank, Mary Scibetta, Gordon Johnson, Kim Ferguson, Tom Copi
 Management: Kim Ferguson
 Agent: Willard Alexander
 Public Relations: Peter Levinson
 M.F. Band assistant road manager: Susan McGonigle
 M.F. Band concert lighting: Reed Rankin

Notes

References

External links 
 

1977 albums
Columbia Records albums
Maynard Ferguson albums